UKLR may refer to:

 UKLR, the ICAO code for Rivne International Airport, Ukraine
 UKLR, the Indian Railways station code for Ukilerhat railway station, West Bengal, India